Reza Parkas is an Iranian-born Iranian-German football manager who was lately the manager of the Iranian club Sanat Naft Abadan.

Coaching career
Parkas is an Iranian born Iranian-German football coach, and has coaching experience in Germany, the UAE, Iran, and Oman. Parkas also worked as a Referee in Germany. He was the head coach of the Brothers Union club.

Parkas was named as Istaravshan's Head Coach during their squad announcement for the 2022 Tajikistan Higher League season.

References

Living people
People from Abadan, Iran
German football managers
German expatriate football managers
Expatriate football managers in Bangladesh
Iranian football managers
Persian Gulf Pro League managers
Sanat Naft Abadan F.C. managers
1968 births